Kraglievichia is an extinct genus of cingulate belonging to the family Pampatheriidae. It lived from the Late Miocene to the Early Pliocene, and its fossilized remains were discovered in South America.

Description

This animal looked like an enormous armadillo, with body dimensions comparable or larger than the modern giant armadillo ; its skull was 18 centimeters long. As for all its relatives, the pampatheres, the structure of the armor of Kraglievichia forbade it to curl up, as most modern armadillos does. The genus was characterized by the presence of four upper teeth and three lower teeth with an oval section, a characteristic differentiating it from the very similar but smaller Vassallia. The osteoderms of its carapace had an elevated axial area, underlined by two lateral longitudinal depressions.

Classification

The genus Kraglievichia was established in 1927 by Castellanos, for a species of fossil cingulate first described in 1883 by Florentino Ameghino. The type species, Kraglievichia paranense, is documented in the fossil records in Argentina and Uruguay. Some isolated osteoderms, with a morphology similar to those of Kraglievichia, but also to those of Pampatherium, have been described by Castellanos under the name Plaina intermedia. It is however probable that those fossils should in fact be attributed to the genus Kraglievichia.

Kraglievichia was a member of the family Pampatheriidae, a clade of cingulates very similar to modern armadillos, and closely related to them. Kraglievichia was a rather derived member of this group, potentially ancestral to the large Pleistocene genera Holmesina and Pampatherium.

Bibliography
Castellanos, A. (1927). Breves notas sobre los clamidoterios. Publ. Cent. Est. Ing. Rosario 1–8, Argentina.
A. L. Cione, M. M. Azpelicueta, M. Bond, A. A. Carlini, J. R. Casciotta, M. A. Cozzuol, M. Fuente, Z. Gasparini, F. J. Goin, J. Noriega, G. J. Scillato-Yane, L. Soibelzon, E. P. Tonni, D. Verzi, and M. G. Vucetich. 2000. Miocene vertebrates from Entre Rios province, eastern Argentina. Serie Correlacion Geologica 14:191-237
S. F. Vizcaino, A. Rinderknecht, and A. Czerwonogora. 2003. An Enigmatic Cingulata (Mammalia: Xenarthra) from the Late Miocene of Uruguay. Journal of Vertebrate Paleontology 23(4):981-983
G. J. Scillato-Yané, F. Góis, A. E. Zurita, A. A. Carlini, L. R. González-Ruiz, C. M. Krmpotic, C. Oliva and M. Zamorano. 2013. Los cingulata (Mammalia, Xenarthra) del "Conglomerado Osífero" (Mioceno tardío) de la Formación Ituzaingó de Entre Ríos, Argentina. In D. Brandoni, J.I. Noriega (eds.), El Neógeno de la Mesopotamia argentina 14:118-134
R. L. Tomassini, C. I. Montalvo, C.M. Deschamps and T. Manera. 2013. Biostratigraphy and biochronology of the Monte Hermoso Formation (early Pliocene) at its type locality, Buenos Aires Province, Argentina. Journal of South American Earth Sciences 48:31-42

Prehistoric cingulates
Prehistoric placental genera
Miocene xenarthrans
Miocene genus first appearances
Miocene mammals of South America
Pliocene mammals of South America
Pliocene xenarthrans
Pliocene genus extinctions
Neogene Argentina
Fossils of Argentina
Fossils of Uruguay
Neogene Uruguay
Ituzaingó Formation
Fossil taxa described in 1927